Larry Clifford Bergh (born April 2, 1942) is an American former professional basketball player.

He was raised in Trenton, North Dakota, a Native American community. He is the son of a Native American mother, Selina (née Falcon) (1909–1996), and a Norwegian father, Orris Bergh (1905–1982). The family then moved to Walla Walla, Washington in the late 1950s.

A 6'8" forward from Weber State University, Bergh was selected by the Chicago Bulls in the eleventh round of the 1969 NBA Draft. He never played with the Bulls, however, joining instead the Pittsburgh Pipers of the American Basketball Association. In 20 games with the Pipers, Bergh averaged 6.1 points and 4.3 rebounds. He played for the Allentown Jets of the Eastern Basketball Association from 1970 to 1972. Bergh was selected to the All-EBA First Team in 1971.

Bergh later became known as a softball player.

A father of three and grandfather of five, he lives in Tennessee with his wife, Pat.

References

External links

1945 births
Living people
Allentown Jets players
American men's basketball players
Basketball players from North Dakota
Chicago Bulls draft picks
People from Williston, North Dakota
Pittsburgh Pipers players
Power forwards (basketball)
Weber State Wildcats men's basketball players